Broek may refer to:

Places

the Netherlands
 Broek op Langedijk
 Broek in Waterland
 Broek, Friesland, in the municipality of De Fryske Marren , province of Friesland
 Broek, Gouda, a former municipality near Gouda, province of South Holland
 Broek, Groningen, in the municipality of De Marne, province of Groningen
 Broek, Gulpen, in the municipality of Gulpen-Wittem, province of Limburg
 Broek, North-Brabant, in the municipality of Laarbeek, province of North Brabant
 Broek, Vijfheerenlanden, in the municipality of Vijfheerenlanden, province of Utrecht
 Broek, a former name of Stede Broec

See also 
 Broucke, a Belgian surname
 van den Broek, a Dutch surname
 Leerbroek, a village in the municipality of Vijfheerenlanden, province of Utrecht, Netherlands 
 Babyloniënbroek, a village in the municipality of Aalburg, province of North Brabant, The Netherlands